Simon & Garfunkel, an American singer-songwriter duo, has released five studio albums, fifteen compilation albums, four live albums, one extended play, twenty-six singles, one soundtrack, and four box sets since 1964. Paul Simon and Art Garfunkel first formed a duo in 1957 as Tom & Jerry, before separating and later reforming as Simon & Garfunkel.

Simon & Garfunkel's debut album, Wednesday Morning, 3 A.M., was released on October 19, 1964. Initially a flop, it was re-released two years later with the new version of the single "The Sound of Silence", which was overdubbed with electric instruments and drums by producer Tom Wilson. The re-released version peaked at number thirty in the US Billboard 200 chart and at twenty-four in the UK Albums Chart, and later received a platinum certification by the Recording Industry Association of America (RIAA). The overdubbed version of the eponymous single was released on their second studio album, Sounds of Silence, released on January 17, 1966. It peaked at twenty-one on the Billboard charts and at thirty in the UK Album Charts, and later received a three-times multi-platinum certification by the RIAA. Besides the same-named single, the album also featured Simon's "I Am a Rock", a song that first appeared on his 1965 debut solo album, The Paul Simon Songbook.

Simon & Garfunkel's third album, Parsley, Sage, Rosemary and Thyme, was released on October 10, 1966, and produced five singles. It peaked at number four in the US and number thirteen in the UK, and received a three-time multi-platinum certification by RIAA. The single "Mrs. Robinson" was included in the duo's first and only soundtrack, The Graduate, and was later included on their fourth studio album Bookends, which was released on April 3, 1968. It peaked at number one in both the US and UK, therefore becoming their first number one album, and received two-times multi-platinum in the US. On January 26, 1970, they released their fifth and final studio album, Bridge over Troubled Water. It was their most successful to date, peaking at number one in several countries, including the UK and US. The album sold over twenty-five million copies worldwide, and received eight-time multi-platinum in the US.

Despite the success of their fifth album, the duo Simon & Garfunkel decided to part company, announcing their break-up later that year. They have nonetheless made a number of reunion performances, including a free concert in New York City's Central Park in 1981, which drew a crowd of half-a-million people and resulted in the live album The Concert in Central Park.

Albums

Studio albums

Notes
A In Japan, these albums entered the chart for the first time with the 2003 reissue.
B  the re-release of Parsley, Sage, Rosemary and Thyme on August 31, 1968, in the UK.

Live albums

Soundtracks

Compilation albums

Box sets

Video albums

Singles and EPs

Notes
C  as Tom & Jerry.
D  Chart position is from the official UK "Breakers List".
E  Originally released as Tom & Jerry (BIG 618 & HUNT 319). Re-released by ABC Paramount under the name Simon & Garfunkel in 1966.
F  Credited to Art Garfunkel with James Taylor & Paul Simon

Other appearances

Studio

Live

See also
Paul Simon discography
Art Garfunkel discography

References

Further reading

External links
 
 
 

Discographies of American artists
Folk music discographies
Discography